Maple Grove Township was a civil township in Cheboygan County in the U.S. state of Michigan.  

The township was created from the southern half of Forest Township in 1909.  Maple Grove Township last reported a population of 10 at the 1940 census.  In 1942, it merged back into Forest Township due to a low population.

History

Maple Grove Township was first established on October 28, 1909.  It was set aside from the southern  survey township area of Forest Township in the southeastern corner of Cheboygan County.

Although the township was created prior to the 1910 census, the new township went unreported in that decennial census.  In the 1920 census, the population was recorded at 63.  The township recorded a population of 33 in the 1930 census.  In the 1940 census, the township recorded only 10 residents.  Because of its very low population, the township returned back to Forest Township in 1942, at which time Maple Grove Township ceased to exist.

Geography
Although the township never had any precise area measurements, it occupied the southern 36 sections of Forest Township, which is a survey township area approximately equal to  total.  

The township contained Dorsy Lake (or Duby Lake) and Silver Lake.  The Black River also flowed through the township.  The rural township had no major roadways, although M-33 was created in 1919 and ran near the eastern edge of the township.

References

Former populated places in Cheboygan County, Michigan
Defunct townships in Michigan
1909 establishments in Michigan
Populated places established in 1909
1942 disestablishments in Michigan
Populated places disestablished in 1942